Marko Tiidla (born 1 July 1991) is an Estonian swimmer.

He was born in Tartu. In 2013 he graduated from the University of Tartu with a degree in information technology.

He began his swimming career in 2001, coached by Annelii Jaal. He is multiple-times Estonian champion in different swimming disciplines. 2009–2014 he was a member of Estonian national swimming team.

2013-2016 he was a coach at Tartu Swimming Club.

References

Living people
1991 births
Estonian male butterfly swimmers
Estonian male freestyle swimmers
University of Tartu alumni
Sportspeople from Tartu
21st-century Estonian people